Marek Jandołowicz, O.C.D. (1713–1799), was a Polish priest and Discalced Carmelite friar, who was a patriot in the history of his nation.

One of the founders of the Bar Confederation, Jandołowicz became its spiritual and religious leader. Taken prisoner by the Russian authorities and imprisoned for six years, he took part in the Kościuszko Uprising. His person has become an inspiration to poets and writers of the romanticism period, appearing for example in works of Seweryn Goszczyński and Juliusz Słowacki.

1713 births
1799 deaths
Clergy from Lviv
People from Ruthenian Voivodeship
Discalced Carmelites
18th-century Polish–Lithuanian Roman Catholic priests
Bar confederates
Kościuszko insurgents